North Star was a sternwheel steamer that operated in western Montana and southeastern British Columbia on the Kootenay and Columbia rivers from 1897 to 1903.  The vessel should not be confused with other steamers of the same name, some of which were similarly designed and operated in British Columbia and the U.S. state of Washington.

Design and construction
North Star was built by Louis Pacquet, a shipbuilder from Portland, Oregon, for Capt. Frank P. Armstrong (1859-1923).  Armstrong ran sternwheelers on the Kootenay and Columbia rivers under the name of the Upper Columbia Navigation and Tramway Company ("UCN&T").  Armstrong's domination of the Kootenay River steamboat business was threatened by the construction of another new steamer, the J.D. Farrell by the Kootenay River Navigation Company, a firm with financial backing from Spokane, Washington business interests.  North Star was technically owned by American subsidiaries of the UCN&T, first the Upper Kootenay Navigation Company and then the International Transportation Company.

Operations on Kootenay River

In June 1897 North Star started making runs from Jennings, Montana up the Kootenay river to Fort Steele, BC, where significant mining activity was occurring.  The route ran through the dangerous stretch of Jennings Canyon where most of the sternwheelers on the upper Kootenay eventually were wrecked or seriously damaged.  In April 1898 North Star was likewise wrecked in the Canyon.  Armstrong was able to raise the vessel and return her to service.  (Most of the Jennings Canyon has now been submerged by the waters behind Libby Dam.

Joint operations with Kootenay River Navigation Company
[[Image:JD Farrell and North Star (sternwheelers) at Jennings Montana ca 1900.JPG|thumb|right|North Star (on left) laid up at Jennings, Montana with [[J.D. Farrell (sternwheeler)|J.D. Farrell]]]]
During 1898, Captain Armstrong and Captain M. L. McCormack, manager of the Kootenay River Navigation Company, combined their efforts on the upper Kootenay, with the Armstrong boats North Star and Gwendoline receiving 60% of the freight receipts, with the balance to McCormack's single boat J.D. Farrell.  In October 1898 railroads were completed in the Kootenay region, and traffic quickly shifted over to the railways, leaving the steamboats without business.  North Star was laid up at Jennings, Montana with other upper Kootenay river sternwheelers until 1901, when the A. Guthrie Co. put them back in service to transport supplies for construction of the extension of the Great Northern Railway to Fernie, BC.    In the fall of 1901, the railway construction was complete, and North Star and the other steamboats were laid up again.

Transit of Baillie-Grohman Canal

In October 1901 Captain Armstrong bought out the minority interest that Captain James D. Miller (1830-1914) had held in North Star.  (Miller had also acted as captain of North Star.)  With steamboat business on the upper Kootenay essentially nonexistent, in 1902, Armstrong decided to bring North Star through the Baillie-Grohman Canal at Canal Flats, BC to the upper reach of the Columbia River that began at Columbia Lake and ran down the Columbia Valley to Golden, BC.  North Star left Fort Steele on June 4, 1902. North Star was the last steamboat to depart that community, which was in rapid decline because of being bypassed by recent railway construction.

The Baillie-Grohman canal had been used by a steamboat just twice before. Both transits were by the sternwheeler Gwendoline which passed through the canal northwards in 1893 or 1894, and then south again in 1894. Gwendoline was a much smaller steamboat than North Star ( and 90 gross tons for Gwendoline compared to and 380 gross tons for North Star). By 1902, the canal, which for the most part had been dug in soft earth, had sloughed in. Worse for North Star was that the canal included a lock, which was  feet long. North Star was also 9 inches too wide for the lock. Many at the time considered the task impossible.

The Baillie-Grohman canal was only a little over a mile long, but it was in such poor condition that it took two weeks to coax North Star through it.  The brush had overgrown the canal and the water was shallow causing the steamer to scrape bottom.  At one point, a tree fell onto the steamer, just missing Armstrong's young daughter Ruth (for whom his steamer Ruth had been named).  When North Star came to the lock, Armstrong solved the width problem by simply sawing 5 or 6 inches off the guards (the thick timber running along the top outside edge of a sternwheeler's hull).  The length problem was solved differently.  In those days, ore was packed out of mines in the Kootenay country by stuffing oxhides full of the mineral, and dragging or sliding the filled hides to the nearest steamboat landing or rail depot.  Anderson had a number of oxhides on board North Star and he had them filled with sand and piled up to form temporary lock gates.  He then destroyed the existing gates, and when the North Star was between the pair of temporary lock gates, he blew the forward temporary gates out with dynamite, and the steamer surged forward with the rush of water into the lower part of the canal.

Once through the canal, a low bridge across the Columbia River blocked the vessel's path.  Armstrong hoisted the bridge out of the way with the North Star's capstan, then replaced it once the vessel had passed by.  North Star finally arrived at Golden on July 2, 1902, thus becoming, with Gwendoline one of the only two steamers ever to operate on both the upper Columbia and the upper Kootenay rivers.

Operations on the Columbia River and customs seizure
Captain Armstrong ran North Star on the Columbia river out of Golden for two seasons, but then the Canadian Customs officials realized Armstrong had not paid custom duties on North Star when he'd brought the vessel into Canada permanently from the United States.  Technically the vessel was seized by Canadian customs, but in practice this meant that Armstrong was forced take his vessel at Golden until the duty was paid.  This apparently did not trouble Armstrong greatly, as he used North Star as a source of spare parts for his other steamboats.

Notes

Further reading

 Faber, Jim, Steamer's Wake—Voyaging down the old marine highways of Puget Sound, British Columbia, and the Columbia River, Enetai Press, Seattle, WA 1985 
 Timmen, Fritz, Blow for the Landing'', 75–78, 134, Caxton Printers, Caldwell, ID 1972

External links
 Columbia Basin Institute of Regional History
 Fort Steele Heritage Town

Paddle steamers of British Columbia
Steamboats of the Columbia River
Steamboats of the Kootenay River
Columbia Valley
Transportation in Lincoln County, Montana
1897 ships